The Canadian Machine Gun Corps (CMGC) was an administrative corps of the Canadian Expeditionary Force (CEF) and of the Canadian Militia. It was part of the CEF sent to France during World War I. The Canadian Permanent Machine Gun Brigade was organized in the Permanent Force on 16 April 1917. The Canadian Permanent Machine Gun Brigade was redesignated the Royal Canadian Permanent Machine Gun Brigade on 16 June 1921. The Royal Canadian Permanent Machine Gun Brigade was disbanded on 1 November 1923. The Non-Permanent Active Militia  component of the CMGC continued to serve until it was disbanded as part of the 1936 Canadian Militia reorganization, and its roles were transferred to the newly formed infantry (machine gun) battalions. The CMGC donated a wall plaque at St. George's Church in Ypres.

History 
The Canadian Machine Gun Corps was formed on 16 April 1917 and the official publication of the formation occurred in the Canadians' Routine Order 558 of 22 February 1917. It was initially composed of: 
 Machine Gun Squadron, Canadian Cavalry Brigade, 
 Machine gun companies, 
 1st Motor Machine Gun Brigade and motor machine gun batteries, 
 A depot organized in England on 4 January 1917 (authorized by Canadians' Routine Order 150 of same date).

During the Battle of Vimy Ridge the CMGC, with some British units, used a total of 362 Vickers guns.  104 guns went forward with the infantry while 258 were used in the indirect barrage role.  Nearly 5 million rounds of ammunition were allocated for the barrage.

Related units 
This unit was allied with the Machine Gun Corps of the British Army.

References 

Bibliography

External links 
 
 
 
 

Administrative corps of the Canadian Army
Army units and formations of Canada in World War I
Military units and formations established in 1919
Canadian Expeditionary Force
1919 establishments in Canada
1936 disestablishments in Canada